Oliver Erichson Janson (1850 – 25 November 1925) was an English entomologist who specialised in Coleoptera.

He was the son of Edward Wesley Janson and took over the family natural history and publishing business.
Janson's early years were spent at Fortis Green, and he collected beetles there and at Finchley, Hampstead and Highgate.
In 1906 he made an expedition to Iceland adding to the collections of the National Museum of Iceland
During the First World War he made three trips to Ireland, particularly Co Kerry.
Janson was a world authority on Cetoniinae publishing new genera and species mostly in Cistula Entomologica published by Janson and Co.
His world collection was purchased by Titus Valck Lucassen. His collection, in turn, was acquired by the Rijksmuseum van Natuurlijke Historie at Leiden in 1940.

He was a Fellow of the Royal Entomological Society from 1869 until his death.

Works
Partial list

Coleoptera
 Descriptions of three new species of American Cetoniidae. Cistula Entomologica. 1:373-376 (1875). 
 Notices of new or little known Cetoniidae. Cistula Entomologica. 2:133-140 (1876).
 Descriptions of new American Cetoniidae, Part 2. Cistula Entomologica. 2:581-585 (1881). 
 Notices of new or little known Cetoniidae. Cistula Entomologica. 3:139-152 (1885). 
 On the male sex of Argyripa subfasciata Rits., and description of a new species of the cetoniid genus Allorhina. Not. Leyden Mus. 10:118-120(1886).
Lepidoptera
 Notes on Japanese Rhopalocera with the description of new species Cistula ent. 2 : 153-160 (1877)
 Descriptions of two new eastern Species of the genus Papilio Cistula ent. 2 (21) : 433-434, pl. 8 (1879)

References

Anonym 1927 [Janson, O. E.]  Entomologist's Monthly Magazine (3) 63 15-16 
Anonym 1927 [Janson, O. E.]  Entomologist 60 72

1850 births
1925 deaths
Fellows of the Royal Entomological Society
English lepidopterists
People from Fortis Green